Canary Season is a 1993 Bulgarian drama film directed by Evgeni Mihailov. The film was selected as the Bulgarian entry for the Best Foreign Language Film at the 66th Academy Awards, but was not accepted as a nominee.

Cast
 Paraskeva Djukelova as Young Lily
 Plamena Getova as Old Lily
 Mikhael Dontchev as Malin
 Petar Popyordanov as Ivan, Father of Malin
 Michail Alexandrov as Yoyng Malin
 Ani Vulchanova as Margarita
 Plamen Serakov as Tanasi

See also
 List of submissions to the 66th Academy Awards for Best Foreign Language Film
 List of Bulgarian submissions for the Academy Award for Best Foreign Language Film

References

External links
 

1993 films
1993 drama films
Bulgarian drama films
Bulgarian-language films